Although primarily a Christian-based network, Smile has acquired some secular programming from outside producers and the public domain, such as Lassie and The Big Garage, as well as acquiring the U.S. rights to Canadian series such as Mickey's Farm. It also airs family-oriented movies with religious/inspirational themes on Friday afternoons and Saturday evenings.

Current programming
Programs in bold indicate that the programming also airs Saturdays on TBN as part of their "Smile" children's block.

All programs listed are designated as E/I by Smile, completely fulfilling the Federal Communications Commission's educational programming requirements.

 Adventures in Booga Booga Land (2012–present)
 The Adventures of Carlos Caterpillar (2011–present)
 Arnie's Shack (2008–present)
 BB's Bedtime Stories (2010–present)
 Becky and Todd's Bible Adventures (2021–present)
 Becky's Barn (2005–present)
 Bethel Music Kids: Come Alive
 The Boulder Buddies Music Videos (unknown)
 The Charlie Church Mouse Show (2008–present)
 Colby's Clubhouse (2005–present)
 Come On Over (2011–present)
 The Dooley and Pals Show (2005–present)
 Dr. Wonder's Workshop (2007–present)
 Face Your Fears with the Moores (2021–present)
 The Fairies (2023–present)
 The Filling Station (2005–present)
 Gospel Bill (2005–present)
 Hermie and Friends (2010–present)
 Holy Moly (2021–present)
 Jay Jay the Jet Plane (2021–present)
 Kids Like You (2005–present)
 The Knock Knock Show (2005–present)
 Mary Rice Hopkins and Puppets with a Heart (2008–present)
 Mickey's Farm (2012–present)
 Mike's Inspiration Station (2010–present)
 Mustard Pancakes (2010–present)
 Nanna's Cottage (2006–present)
 Pahappahooey Island (2005–present)
 Paws & Tales (2010–present)
 Quigley's Village (2005–present)
 Retro News: A Blast from the Past (2005–present)
 Rocka-Bye Island (2015–present)
 Ryan Defrates: Secret Agent (2020-present)
 Sarah's Stories (2008–present)
 Sea Kids (2020–present}
 Storytime With Anthony Destefano (2021–present)
 Super Naturally Healthy Kids with Chef Joanne (2008–present)
 Super Simple Science Stuff (2010–present)
 Theo (2018–present)
 TuneTime (2016–present)
 Two by 2 (2018–present)
 VeggieTales (2013–present)
 Weekend Movie Showcase (unknown)
 Whirl: Ada & Friends (2021–present)
 Whirl: Leo & Friends (2021–present)
 Yancy and Friends: Little Praise Party (unknown)
 Zoo Clues (2014–present)

Former programming

 3-2-1 Penguins! (2013–2019)
 The Adventures of Donkey Ollie (2010-2021) 
 Animal Action with Eddie & Greg (2007-2016)
 Animal Atlas (2009-2018)
 The Adventures of Skippy (2014-2019)
 Animated Hero Classics (2011-2018)
 Animated Stories from the Bible (2011–2018)
 Another Sommertime Adventure (2007–2021)
 Aqua Kids Adventures (2008–2010, 2013–2021)
 Auto-B-Good (2008–2019)
 The Bedbug Bible Gang (2011–2021)
 Ben Ketting and the Children of Light (2008–2020)
 The Big Garage (2008-2019)
 Bibleman (2005-2010)
 BJ's Teddy Bear Club and Bible Stories (2005-2020)
 Bono Duck 90-Second Radio Show(unknown)
 Booples! (2007-2009)
 Booples Video Animated Shorts(Unknown)
 The Boulder Buddies (2007-2015)
 Boy Plus Dog (unknown)
 Bugtime Adventures (2008-2020)
 Cherub Wings (2005-2021)
 Children's Heroes of the Bible (2006-2020)
 The Choo Choo Bob Show (2012–2021)
 Christopher Columbus (2013-2020)
 Chubby Cubbies (2008-2021)
 Circle Square (2005-2009)
 Cowboy Dan's Frontier (2011-2020)
 Creation's Creatures (2007-2021)
 Curiosity Quest (2017-2021)
 Curtain Climbing Kids Club (2005-2021)
 D.A.R.E. Safety Tips Starring Retro Bill (2008-2018)
 Davey and Goliath (2005-2018)
 Deputy Dingle (2009-2015)
 Education Station (unknown)
 The Enríquez Family (unknown)
 Ewe Know (2008-2017)
 Faithville (2005-2022)
 Fluffy Gardens (2012-2018)
 The Flying House (2005-2021)
 The Fred and Susie Show (2016-2021)
 Friends and Heroes (2007-2013)
 From Aardvark to Zucchini (2012–2022)
 Fun Food Adventures (2006-2016)
 The Funny Company (2006-2016)
 Gaither's Pond (unknown)
 Gerbert (2009-2019)
 Gina D's Kids Club (2007–2022)
 God Rocks!/God Rocks Bibletoons (2007-2013)
 God Rocks! Music Videos(unknown)
 Going Wild (2008-2012)
 Grandfather Reads (2008-2018)
 Hippothesis (2015)
 His Kids (2008-2009)
 The Hugglers(Unknown)
 The Huggabug Club (2009-2016)
 ImagineLand (2006-2012)
 I'm An Animal (2006-2017)
 iShine KNECT (2009-2021)
 Jacob's Ladder (2007-2017)
 Janice's Attic (2005-2007)
 Joy Junction (2005-2012)
 Just the Facts (2005-2008)
 Katakune (2014-2022)
 Kids Against Crime (2005-2010)
 Kidz Quest(unknown)
 Kingdom Adventure (2005-2007)
 The Lad's TV (2010-2017)
 Lassie (2013-2018)
 Life at the Pond (2007-2014)
 Little Buds (2007-2017)
 Little Women (2009-2017)
 Maralee Dawn and Friends (2005-2016)
 Matsiko Children's Choir
 McGee and Me! (2005-2010)
 Miss BG (2013-2018)
 Miss Charity's Diner (2005-2022)
 The Mooh Brothers (2012-2014)
 Monster Truck Adventures (2013-2020)
 Mouse in the House(2014)
 Mr. Henry's Wild & Wacky World (2005-2009)
 My Bedbugs (2007-2009)
 The New Superbook (2017-2022)
 Nite Nite Franky Show(unknown)
 NIV Kids Club Music Videos (2009-2022)
 OKTV (2008-2013)
 Owlegories (2017-2021)
 PicTrain (2014-2020)
 Pit Pony (2010-2012)
 PraiseMoves Kids (2010-2012)
 Professor Bounce's Kid Fit (2008-2021)
 Puppet Parade (2006-2021)
 Raggs (2015-2020)
 ReFURbished Tails (2008-2017)
 The Reppies (2005-2021)
 RocKids TV (2013-2021)
 Safari Tracks(2007-2014)
 Sing Along with Gina D (2007-2016, 2021–2022)
 St. Bear's Dolls Hospital (2008-2017)
 The Story Keepers (2008-2018)
 Storytime Circus Theater (2007-2008)
 the Super Snooprs (unknown)
 Superbook (2005-2022)
 The Swamp Critters of Lost Lagoon (2005-2021)
 Swiss Family Robinson (2009-2017)
 The Tails of Abbygail (2013-2018)
 Timbuktoons (2010-2016)
 Time with Dizzy (2007-2011)
 Tiny Square Critters (2014-2021)
 Topsy Turvy (2018-2022)
 Totally, Zinghoppers (2012–2022)
 The Upstairs Downstairs Bears (2008-2017)
 Vipo: Adventures of the Flying Dog (2008-2013)
 Virtual Memory (2005-2006)
 Wee Sing(Unknown)
 Why?(2015)
 Wild's Life (2007-2015)
 Wild About Animals (2014-2021)
 The World of Jonathan Singh (2008-2021)
 The Wumblers (2007-2010)
 WWJDtv with Gina Thompson (2005-2006)
 Young America Outdoors (2011-2015)
 The Zula Patrol (2015-2020)

References

External links
 https://smileofachildtv.org/schedule/

Smile